The 2009 Women's World Floorball Championships were the seventh world championships in women's floorball. The tournament was held from December 5 to 12, 2009 in Västerås, Sweden. Matches took place in the Bombardier Arena and ABB Arena Nord. Sweden won the tournament defeating Switzerland, 6-2, in the final-game while Finland defeated the Czech Republic, 3-1, in the bronze medal game.

Championship results

Preliminary round

Group A

Group B

Playoffs

Semi-finals

Bronze Medal match

World Championship match

Placement round

9th Place match

7th Place match

5th Place match

Leading scorers

All-Star team
Goalkeeper:  Laura Tomatis
Defense:     Simone Berner,  Lisah Samuelsson
Forward:     Emelie Lindström,  Karolina Widar,   Sara Kristoffersson

Ranking

Official 2009 Rankings according to the IFF

References

External links
 Official Standings (IFF)

2009, Women's
Floorball
Women's World Floorball Championships, 2009
International floorball competitions hosted by Sweden
December 2009 sports events in Europe
Sports competitions in Västerås